The Men's team pursuit race of the 2015 World Single Distance Speed Skating Championships was held on 13 February 2015.

Results
The race was started at 21:35.

References

Men's team pursuit